The FIS Ski Flying World Ski Championships 2002 took place on 9 and 10 March 2002 at Čerťák in Harrachov, Czech Republic for the third time. Harrachov hosted the championships previously in Czechoslovakia in 1983 and 1992. This marked the first time the event took place on separate days. Germany's Sven Hannawald led after the first day, but the results were allowed to stand after two jumps after weather cancelled the final two jumps on the second day. Hannawald became the first repeat winner of the championships as a result. Finland's Matti Hautamäki had the longest jump of the competition  with his first-round jump of 202.5 m.

Individual
9 March 2002

Medal table

References
FIS Ski flying World Championships 2002 event information. - accessed 28 November 2009.
FIS Ski flying World Championships 2002 results. - accessed 28 November 2009.

FIS Ski Flying World Championships
2002 in ski jumping
2002 in Czech sport
Sport in Harrachov
March 2002 sports events in Europe
Ski jumping competitions in the Czech Republic